Curtomerus piraiuba is a species of beetle in the family Cerambycidae. It was described by Martins and Galileo in 2006.

References

Elaphidiini
Beetles described in 2006